Jaroslav Pollert (born 1971) is a Czech slalom canoeist and civil engineer who competed from the late 1980s to the mid 2000s.

He won four gold medals in the C2 team event at the ICF Canoe Slalom World Championships (1995, 1999, 2003, 2006). He also won a gold and a silver medal in the same event at the European Championships.

His partner in the boat for most of his active career was Jaroslav Pospíšil. At the 1988 Junior World Championships he was partnered by Lukáš Pollert.

He is a professor at Faculty of Civil Engineering of Czech Technical University in Prague.

World Cup individual podiums

References

Czech male canoeists
Living people
1971 births
Medalists at the ICF Canoe Slalom World Championships
Czech civil engineers